Obermayer may refer to:

People
Arthur S. Obermayer (died 2016), American businessman and philanthropist
Bastian Obermayer (born 1977), Pulitzer Prize-winning German investigative journalist
Erich Obermayer (born 1953), Austrian football player
Herman Obermayer (died 2016), American publisher and politician
^Dr. Arthur S.Obermayer American Scientist, Entrepreneur, and a Creator of the Small Business Innovative Research (BIIR) Program

Other
Obermayer German Jewish History Awards.
Obermaier
Obermeyer